USS LST-734 was an LST-542-class tank landing ship in the United States Navy. Like many of her class, she was not named and is properly referred to by her hull designation.

Construction and commissioning  

LST-734 was laid down on 25 January 1944, at Pittsburgh, Pennsylvania, by the Dravo Corporation, Neville Island; launched on 4 March 1944; sponsored by Mrs. W. P. Spofford; and commissioned on 22 April 1944.

Service in United States Navy

1940s 
During World War II, LST-734 was assigned to the Asiatic-Pacific theater and participated in the following operations:

Capture and occupation of southern Palau Islands — September and October 1944
Leyte landings—October and November 1944
Ormoc Bay landings—December 1944
Zambales - Subic Bay — January 1945
Assault and occupation of Okinawa Gunto—April through June 1945

Following the war, LST-734 performed occupation duty in the Far East until late December 1945. She returned to the United States and was decommissioned on 7 May 1946 and struck from the Navy list on 5 June that same year. On 24 May 1948, the ship was sold to the Bethlehem Steel Co., of Bethlehem, Pennsylvania, and renamed McWilliams.  She was then transferred to Argentina.

LST-734 earned four battle stars for World War II service.

Argentine service

1940s-1970s 
She was sold to the Argentinian Ministry of Transport in 1948, and designated 276-B. She was transferred to the Argentine Navy, and acquired the designation BDT-14 (BDT: Buque Desembarco de Tanques). On 24 February 1959, she was renamed Cabo San Vincente. She was retired in 1966, and put on disposal in 1969. Cabo San Vincente was sold to May Zetone & Co., in 1971.

Awards and honors 

 American Campaign Medal
 Asiatic-Pacific Campaign Medal (4 awards)
 World War II Victory Medal
 Navy Occupation Service Medal with “Asia” clasp
 Philippines Presidential Unit Citation
 Philippines Liberation Medal (2 awards)

References

Bibliography

Further reading

External links

 

LST-542-class tank landing ships
World War II amphibious warfare vessels of the United States
Ships built in Pittsburgh
1944 ships
LST-542-class tank landing ships of the Argentine Navy
Ships built by Dravo Corporation